Anjale is a small town which is situated 8 km from Bhusawal in Jalgaon district, Maharashtra, India.

Cities and towns in Jalgaon district